Norbert Petschel (born 25 April 1961) is an Austrian sailor. He competed at the 1984 Summer Olympics and the 1988 Summer Olympics.

References

External links
 

1961 births
Living people
Austrian male sailors (sport)
Olympic sailors of Austria
Sailors at the 1984 Summer Olympics – Tornado
Sailors at the 1988 Summer Olympics – Tornado
Sportspeople from Vienna